Lebanon–European Union relations see substantial ties through the EU's European Neighborhood Policy (ENP). The EU is the largest trading partner of Lebanon.

Agreements
Lebanon concluded negotiations on an association agreement with the European Union in late 2001, and both sides initialed the accord in January 2002, the accord becoming known as the EU-Lebanon Association Agreement. The EU-Lebanon Action Plan from 19 January 2007 gave a new impetus to bilateral relations in the framework of the ENP.

Lebanon is one of the main Mediterranean beneficiaries of community assistance and the EU through its various instruments is Lebanon's leading donor. Starting from 2007, financial support is channeled through the European Neighborhood Policy Instrument. A Lebanon Country Strategy Paper 2007–2013 and a National Indicative Program 2007–2010 have been adopted by the EU. The assistance provided was refocused after the Second Lebanon War in order to engage in real help for the government and the society in reconstruction and reform of the country.

Lebanon is also a member of the EU's Union for the Mediterranean.

Trade
The EU is Lebanon's largest trading partner, accounting a third of its imports at €3.9billion in 2008; this was mainly machinery (22%) and transport equipment (11.7%), chemicals (13%) and energy products (21.2%). Lebanese exports to the EU amounted to €0.36 billion; mainly manufactured products (66%). Lebanon's substantial trade deficit is offset by foreign income earnings, such as from the Lebanese diaspora and the tourism. 60% of Lebanese GDP is in the service sector.

See also 
 Foreign relations of Lebanon
 Foreign relations of the European Union

References

External links
 EU Lebanon Action Plan
 EU Delegation to Lebanon
 European External Action Service

 
EU
Third-country relations of the European Union